U.S. Route 6 (US 6) is a United States Numbered Highway, stretching from Bishop, California, in the west to Provincetown, Massachusetts, on the East Coast. The Nevada portion crosses the center of the state, serving the cities of Tonopah and Ely, en route to Utah and points further east. Like US 50, to the north, large desolate areas are traversed by the route, with few or no signs of civilization, and the highway crosses several large desert valleys separated by numerous mountain ranges towering over the valley floors, in what is known as the Basin and Range Province of the Great Basin.

US 6 has a diverse route through the state, traversing desert, desert mountain ranges and valleys, ghost towns, and Great Basin National Park. The entire highway in Nevada is designated as part of the Grand Army of the Republic Highway and has also been named the Theodore Roosevelt Highway, after the 26th U.S. president. Although US 50 to the north is known as "The Loneliest Road in America", US 6 can be considered as equally deserving of that title due to it serving equally desolate areas.

The route was routed entirely over existing state highways when it was extended into Nevada in 1937; however, all the concurrent state routes were eventually removed. The route has remained largely unchanged, except where it was realigned to enter Utah north of Baker instead of passing through the town.

Route description

From the California border, US 6 heads northeast through semidesert Queen Valley with Boundary Peak, Nevada's highest summit, and Montgomery Peak in California on the right. The highway then climbs into pinyon–juniper woodland and crosses Montgomery Pass .

From the pass, US 6 descends into barren shadscale desert, passing Columbus Marsh on the left, then merging with US 95 from Coaldale to Tonopah.

Just east of Tonopah, US 6 continues east across a series of desert mountain ranges and valleys, including the Monitor Range. At Warm Springs, State Route 375 (SR 375), also known as the "Extraterrestrial Highway", departs to the southeast and US 6 assumes a northeasterly alignment across the Reveille, Pancake, Grant, and White Pine ranges. Rainfall increases eastward, so valleys become less barren and peaks over  add scenic interest.

Ely is the largest town on US 6 in Nevada. US 50 joins US 6 at Ely. East of Ely, US 6 and US 50 cross the Schell Creek Range, known for verdant forests and meadows and for a large mule deer and elk population. The highway descends to Spring Valley, then crosses the Snake Range at Sacramento Pass, north of Nevada's second-highest mountain, Wheeler Peak, where a branch road accesses Great Basin National Park. Beyond the pass, US 6 passes just north of Baker, a Mormon farming community and reaches the Utah state line.

There are no services anywhere between Tonopah and Ely (a distance of about ). Although US 50 has the nickname "The Loneliest Road in America", US 6 has a solid case for the title; as Tonopah and Ely are the only cities it goes through in the  it traverses in Nevada, with a combined population of just over 6,500. In contrast, US 50 boasts Stateline and the rest of the South Lake Tahoe area in Nevada, Carson City, and Fallon, along with other smaller communities. The most heavily traveled portion of US 6 is the portion that is concurrent with US 95, as the latter route connects Las Vegas and Reno, the two largest metropolitan areas in Nevada.

History

US 6 was one of the original U.S. Routes in the 1925 Bureau of Public Roads plan. It was commissioned in 1926 but was not extended west into Nevada until 1937. The alignment of US 6 in Nevada has remained largely unchanged since then.

US 6 was routed entirely over existing state highways in Nevada. Between the California state line west of Montgomery Pass to Basalt, the highway was concurrently routed with SR 10. From Basalt to Coaldale, the highway was concurrently routed with SR 15. From Coaldale to Tonopah, the highway was concurrently routed with SR 3. From Tonopah to Ely, the highway was concurrently routed with SR 4 (also called the Midland Trail). From Ely to present-day Majors Place, the highway was concurrently routed with US 93 and SR 7. From Majors Place to the Utah state line southeast of Baker, the highway was concurrently routed with SR 14.

All the concurrent state routes were removed from US 6 by 1939 except for SR 3 between Coaldale and Tonopah. Also, US 6 was realigned to enter Utah north of Baker instead of passing through the town. In 1940, SR 3 was replaced by US 95 between Coaldale and Tonopah. In 1954, US 50 was realigned between Ely and the Utah border and was concurrently routed over US 6.

Major intersections

Mileposts in Nevada reset at county lines; the start and end mileposts for each county are given in the county column.

See also

References

External links

 
 AARoads: U.S. Highway 6 – Nevada

06
 Nevada
006
Transportation in Esmeralda County, Nevada
Transportation in Mineral County, Nevada
Transportation in Nye County, Nevada
Transportation in White Pine County, Nevada
Ely, Nevada
Tonopah, Nevada